Nkwanta North  is one of the constituencies represented in the Parliament of Ghana. It elects one Member of Parliament (MP) by the first past the post system of election. Nkwanta North is located in the Nkwanta district  of the Oti Region of Ghana.

Boundaries
The seat is located within the Nkwanta North District of the Oti Region of Ghana. It is bounded to the south by the Nkwanta South District and to the east by the Republic of Togo. To the north is the Northern Region and to the west, the Northern Region and the Volta River.

History
It was formed prior to the 2004 December presidential and parliamentary elections by the division of the old Nkwanta constituency into the new Nkwanta North and Nkwanta South constituencies.

Members of Parliament

Elections

See also
List of Ghana Parliament constituencies

References 

Adam Carr's Election Archives
Ghana Home Page

Parliamentary constituencies in the Oti Region